Musketeers Twenty Years After (translit. Mushketeri dvadsat' let spustya) is a four-episode Russian musical film directed by Georgi Yungvald-Khilkevich based on Alexandre Dumas' 1845 novel Twenty Years After.

Filming began in the summer of 1990 and took place in Tallinn, Leningrad and Odessa. In August 1991, the main songs of the film, that were performed by Igor Nadzhiev, were recorded. In 1992, editing and dubbing of the movie were completed. And in January 1993, the premiere took place on the  Channel One Russia of Ostankino.

The previous film was D'Artagnan and Three Musketeers. The next movie — The Secret of Queen Anne or Musketeers Thirty Years After

Plot 
Cardinal Mazarin demands from Anne of Austria to reveal to him the names of four friends who once helped her in the confrontation against Cardinal Richelieu.

The Queen reveals the name of D'Artagnan, lieutenant of the royal musketeers.

The cardinal calls the musketeer and orders him to find Athos, Porthos and Aramis in order to recruit them. However, only Porthos, who became a wealthy landowner du Vallon, agrees to join D'Artagnan. Athos and Aramis are on the side of the Fronde, hostile to the cardinal and led by the Duke of Beaufort, imprisoned in the Château de Vincennes.

The convergence of old friends, separated by political intrigues, occurs when Mordaunt, the son of Lady Winter, decides to take revenge on the Musketeers for the death of his mother.

Four friends get involved with him, as well as with Mr. de Jussac, their old enemy, who joined Mordaunt, in the fight.

Cast 

 Mikhail Boyarsky as d'Artagnan
 Veniamin Smekhov as Athos
 Valentin Smirnitsky as Porthos
 Igor Starygin as Aramis (voiced by Igor Yasulovich)
 Viktor Avilov as Mordaunt
 Vladimir Balon as de Jussac
 Anatoly Ravikovich as Cardinal Mazarin
 Alisa Freindlich as Anne of Austria
 Igor Dmitriev as Duke of Beaufort
 Oleg Belov as Oliver Cromwell
 Yuri Dubrovin as La Schene
 Jaak Prints as servant for Athos
 Alexander Barablin as Parliament commissar
 Yekaterina Strizhenova as Madlen
 Aleksei Petrenko as Charles I
 Arnis Licitis as Lord Winter (voiced by Vladimir Kuznetsov)
 Yuri Sherstnev as Lille hangman
 Boris Kashcheyev as Flamaran
 Sergei Boyarski as young Charles II
 Yevgeni Gerchakov as La Bryuer
 Valentin Bukin as d'Bertua
 Olga Kabo as de Longville
 Inga Ilm as de Longville's maid
 Yelena Karadzhova as Queen Henrietta
 Liliya Ivanova as Princess Henrietta
 Vadim Kondryatev as Comange
 Ermengeld Konovalov as servant for Porthos
 Ivar Kümnik as Musketeer
 Sergei Shnyryov as Raoul, Vicomte De Bragelonne, son of Athos
 Yuliya Sholkova as young Luisa d'Lavalier
 Vasili Vekshin as Commander-in-chief of Charles I's army
 Pavel Vinnik as La Rame
 Larisa Luppian as nun 
 Valentin Maslov as the owner of a tavern in the village
 Viktor Pavlovsky as former referee

References

External links

1992 films
Films based on Twenty Years After
1990s musical films
1990s Russian-language films
Films scored by Maksim Dunayevsky
Cultural depictions of Oliver Cromwell
Cultural depictions of Cardinal Mazarin
Russian swashbuckler films
Russian musical films